Niklas Vesterlund (born 6 June 1999) is a Danish football defender who plays for Tromsø IL.

References

1999 births
Living people
Danish men's footballers
Denmark youth international footballers
Trelleborgs FF players
Tromsø IL players
Danish expatriate men's footballers
Expatriate footballers in Sweden
Danish expatriate sportspeople in Sweden
Expatriate footballers in Norway
Danish expatriate sportspeople in Norway
Superettan players
Eliteserien players
Association football defenders